Gorka is a rural locality (a settlement) and the administrative center of Gorkinskoye Rural Settlement, Kirzhachsky District, Vladimir Oblast, Russia. The population was 1,125 as of 2010. There are 20 streets.

Geography 
Gorka is located on the Sherna River, 15 km north of Kirzhach (the district's administrative centre) by road. Semyonovskoye is the nearest rural locality.

References 

Rural localities in Kirzhachsky District